Faisal Athar is a Pakistani cricketer. He is a right-handed batsman and a right-arm medium-pace bowler, who also plays as a wicket-keeper. He played one One-Day International in 2003 for the losing Pakistani side in the final of the Bank Alfalah Cup of 2003.

He has played extensively in the Quaid-e-Azam Trophy since debuting in the competition for Hyderabad in 1999. He has also participated in the Tissot Cup, the National Bank of Pakistan Cup (for the Pakistan National Shipping Corporation as well as the Public Works Department), and, in 2005, the ABN-AMRO Cup, where his Hyderabad team lost to the Duckworth-Lewis method against the Lahore Lions.

Most recently, he has played in the 2005/06 Pentangular Cup tournament for the National Bank of Pakistan.

References
Faisal Athar at Cricket Archive 

1975 births
Living people
Pakistan One Day International cricketers
Pakistani cricketers
Hyderabad (Pakistan) cricketers
State Bank of Pakistan cricketers
Sui Northern Gas Pipelines Limited cricketers
Pakistan National Shipping Corporation cricketers
Public Works Department cricketers
National Bank of Pakistan cricketers
United Bank Limited cricketers
Sindh cricketers
Zarai Taraqiati Bank Limited cricketers
Cricketers from Hyderabad, Sindh